Tephritini is a tribe of fruit flies in the family Tephritidae. There are about 12 genera and at least 40 described species in Tephritini.

Genera
Acanthiophilus Becker, 1908
Acronneus Munro, 1939
Actinoptera Rondani, 1871
Antoxya Munro, 1957
Axiothauma Munro, 1946
Bevismyia Munro, 1957
Brachydesis Hancock, 1986
Brachytrupanea Hancock, 1986
Campiglossa Rondani, 1870
Capitites Foote & Freidberg, 1981
Celidosphenella Hendel, 1914
Collessomyia Hardy & Drew, 1996
Cooronga Hardy & Drew, 1996
Cryptophorellia Freidberg & Hancock, 1989 
Dectodesis Munro, 1957
Deroparia Munro, 1957
Desmella Munro, 1957
Dioxyna Frey, 1945
Dyseuaresta Hendel, 1928
Elgonina Munro, 1957
Euaresta Loew, 1873
Euarestella Hendel, 1927
Euarestoides Benjamin, 1934
Euryphalara Munro, 1938
Euthauma Munro, 1949
Freidbergia Merz, 1999
Goniurellia Hendel, 1927
Gymnosagena Munro, 1935
Heringina Aczél, 1940
Homoeothrix Hering, 1944
Homoeotricha Hering, 1944
Hyalopeza Munro, 1957
Hyalotephritis Freidberg, 1979
Insizwa Munro, 1929
Lamproxyna Hendel, 1914
Lamproxynella Hering, 1941
Lethyna Munro, 1957
Marriottella Munro, 1939
Mastigolina Munro, 1937
Mesoclanis Munro, 1938
Migmella Munro, 1957
Multireticula Merz, 1999
Namwambina Munro, 1957
Neosphaeniscus Norrbom, 2010
Neotephritis Hendel, 1935
Oedosphenella Frey, 1936
Orotava Frey, 1936
Orthocanthoides Freidberg, 1987
Oxyna Robineau-Desvoidy, 1830
Oxyparna Korneyev, 1990
Pangasella Richter, 1995
Paraactinoptera Hardy & Drew, 1996
Parafreutreta Munro, 1929
Parahyalopeza Hardy & Drew, 1996
Paraspathulina Hardy & Drew, 1996
Paratephritis Shiraki, 1933
Peneparoxyna Hardy & Drew, 1996
Peratomixis Munro, 1947
Phaeogramma Grimshaw, 1901
Pherothrinax Munro, 1957
Plaumannimyia Hering, 1938
Pseudoedaspis Hendel, 1914
Ptosanthus Munro, 1957
Quasicooronga Hardy & Drew, 1996
Scedella Munro, 1957
Soraida Hering, 1941
Spathulina Rondani, 1856
Sphenella Robineau-Desvoidy, 1830
Stelladesis Merz, 1999
Tanaica Munro, 1957
Telaletes Hering, 1938
Tephritis Latreille, 1804
Tephritomyia Hendel, 1927
Tephritoresta Hering, 1942
Tephrodesis Merz, 1999
Trupanea Schrank, 1795
Trupanodesis Merz, 1999
Trypanaresta Hering, 1940
Xanthaciura Hendel, 1914

References

 Richard H. Foote, P. L. Blanc, Allen L. Norrbom. (1993). Handbook of the Fruit Flies (Diptera: Tephritidae) of America North of Mexico. Cornell University Press (Comstock Publishing).

Further reading

 Arnett, Ross H. (2000). American Insects: A Handbook of the Insects of America North of Mexico. CRC Press.

External links

 Diptera.info

Tephritinae